NLTC may refer to:
 Netherlands Telugu Community
 No-load tap changer